Jürgen Wiefel (born 10 March 1952 in Leipzig) is a German former sport shooter who competed in the 1976 Summer Olympics and in the 1980 Summer Olympics.

References

1952 births
Sportspeople from Leipzig
Living people
German male sport shooters
ISSF pistol shooters
Olympic shooters of East Germany
Shooters at the 1976 Summer Olympics
Shooters at the 1980 Summer Olympics
Olympic silver medalists for East Germany
Olympic medalists in shooting
Medalists at the 1980 Summer Olympics
Medalists at the 1976 Summer Olympics
20th-century German people